"Only One You" is a song written by Michael Garvin and Bucky Jones, and recorded by American country music artist T. G. Sheppard.  It was released in November 1981 as the first single from the album Finally!. The song was his ninth No. 1 hit on the Billboard Hot Country Singles chart in February 1982, spending one week atop the chart as part of a 13-week run within the country chart's top 40.

Content
In contrast to some of his earlier hits—including "I Loved 'Em Every One" -- "Only One You" pays tribute to monogamy and uniqueness of a single object of affection. Here, a man illustrates this uniqueness by referencing world landmarks such as the Leaning Tower of Pisa and the Eiffel Tower, masterpieces such as da Vinci's Mona Lisa, the cities New York Town and Paris, Fifth Avenue and one Finest Hour, before telling the woman "there's only one you."

Charts

Weekly charts

Year-end charts

References

1981 singles
1981 songs
T. G. Sheppard songs
Song recordings produced by Buddy Killen
Warner Records singles
Curb Records singles
Songs written by Michael Garvin
Songs written by Bucky Jones
Songs about Paris
Songs about New York City